Corozal may mean:

 Corozal American Cemetery and Memorial, Panama City, Panama
 Corozal District, Belize
 Corozal Town, Belize, capital of the district
 Corozal, Puerto Rico
 Plataneros de Corozal, a volleyball club based in Corozal, Puerto Rico
 Corozal, Sucre, a city of Colombia
 Corozal, Honduras, a village on the north coast of Honduras
 Corozal, Los Santos, Panama
 Corozal, Veraguas, Panama
 Frontera Corozal, Chiapas, Mexico
 Corozal (dredger), a vessel used in the construction of the Panama Canal